Danaluy may refer to:
 Danaluy-e Bozorg
 Danaluy-e Kuchak